Simon Joseph Vernon Watkins (born 20 January 1989) is an English cricketer. Watkins is a left-handed batsman who bowls right-arm off break. He was born in Wandsworth, London and educated at Corfe Hills School in Broadstone, Dorset.

Waktins made his debut for Dorset in the 2007 MCCA Knockout Trophy against Cornwall. He continues to play Minor counties cricket for Dorset, having also appeared for the county in the Minor Counties Championship.

Proceeding to Oxford Brookes University, Watkins made his only first-class appearance for Oxford UCCE against Middlesex in 2010. In the University first-innings, Watkins scored an unbeaten 46. In their second-innings, he scored 8 runs before being dismissed by Josh Davey. With the ball, he bowled without success, sending down 17 wicket-less overs.

He previously played for the Hampshire Second XI from 2006 to 2009.

In 2013 Watkins travelled to Australia, where he represented the Mentone Cricket Club in the Melbourne metropolitan competition, the Victorian Turf Cricket Association.

References

External links
Simon Watkins at ESPNcricinfo
Simon Watkins at CricketArchive

1989 births
Living people
People from Wandsworth
Cricketers from Greater London
English cricketers
Dorset cricketers
Oxford MCCU cricketers
Fellows of the American Physical Society